The Scent of the Night is a 1998 Italian crime-drama film directed by Claudio Caligari. It is loosely based on the novel Le notti di arancia meccanica by Dido Sacchettoni.

The film premiered at the 1998 Venice Film Festival. It was nominated for three Nastro d'Argento Awards.

Cast  
Valerio Mastandrea: Remo Guerra
Marco Giallini: Maurizio Leggeri
Giorgio Tirabassi: Roberto Salvo
Alessia Fugardi: Rita
Franca Scagnetti: maid
Little Tony: himself

See also
 List of Italian films of 1998

References

External links

1998 films
1998 crime drama films
Italian crime drama films
Films directed by Claudio Caligari
Films set in Rome
1990s Italian-language films
1990s Italian films